The 1995 Family Circle Cup was a women's tennis tournament played on outdoor clay courts at the Sea Pines Plantation on Hilton Head Island, South Carolina in the United States that was part of Tier I of the 1995 WTA Tour. The tournament was held from March 27 through April 2, 1995. Conchita Martínez won the singles title.

Finals

Singles

 Conchita Martínez defeated  Magdalena Maleeva 6–1, 6–1
 It was Martínez's 1st title of the year and the 25th of her career.

Doubles

 Nicole Arendt /  Manon Bollegraf defeated  Gigi Fernández /  Natasha Zvereva 0–6, 6–3, 6–4
 It was Arendt's 2nd title of the year and the 4th of her career. It was Bollegraf's 1st title of the year and the 17th of her career.

External links
 WTA Tournament Profile

Family Circle Cup
Charleston Open
Family Circle Cup
Family Circle Cup
Family Circle Cup
Family Circle Cup